Enter Art Fair is Scandinavia's largest art fair and held annually in Copenhagen, Denmark. The fair takes place in late August and brings together over 85 galleries from more than 20 countries and 40 cities at Lokomotivværkstedet, a 10,000 m2 historic events venue. The fair attracts about 25,000 visitors a year and includes an arts program and outdoor exhibition space.

Background 
Enter Art Fair was founded by Julie Leopold Alf who initiated and launched Code Art Fair at Bella Centeret. Enter Art Fair focuses on international contemporary art compared to other art fairs in the region. The fair is backed by Danish investor Lars Seier Christensen among others, and has since its inception had a strong focus on digital art and new ways to experience and acquire art. Galleries apply to participate and a curatorial committee selects these according to specific criteria. The galleries present paintings, sculptures, glass art, ceramics, graphics, video, photography and digital art.

The inaugural event was held in 2019 in a 3,000 m2 tent at Refshaleøen and included 35 international galleries attracting 6000 visitors. The fair moved to Tunnel Fabrikken in Nordhavn in 2020 and included 50 galleries attracting 20.000 visitors. At the 2022 edition, 78 galleries from 23 countries were represented along 350 artists and 60 institutions. The 2023 edition will take place at Lokomotivværkstedet which formerly was used for maintenance of the Danish locomotives.

Art Program 
Since 2019, Irene Campolmi has curated the arts program and was in 2022 recognised by art critic Maria Kjær Themsen for curating the best performance of the year. From 2020 to 2022 she ran the trilogy performance program ‘A Space of Intimacy’ which invited artists, including Michele Rizzo, Miles Greenberg and Fallon Mayanja, to respond to issues of identity, sound and technology. The program has since its inception been supported by the Danish Art Foundation, Augustinus Fonden and Ny Carlsberg Foundation.

 The 2020 edition was titled ‘Thinking Feelings’ and included a performance exploring the Black body in space and “hyper-romantic” gesture by artist Miles Greenberg. 
 The 2021 edition was titled ‘The Shape of Sound’ and included sound installations by artists Stine Deja, Marie Munk and Jens Settergren. Based on theories by Julia Kristeva, Boris Groys, and Mihay Csikszentmihalyi, a dance performance by artist Michele Rizzo and composer Lorenzo Senni explored the interaction between techno music, dance and para-religious practices. In addition, artist Fallon Mayanja presented the performance ‘Feminine’ which explored composer Julius Eastman's original composition ‘The Holy Presence Of Joan D'Arc’ and curator Legacy Russell´s Glitch Feminism Manifesto. 
 The 2022 edition was titled ‘A Space of Intimacy’ and included a performance on queer love by artist Jules Fischer and cello musician and composer Josefine Opsahl. The performance was acknowledged for its innovative approach by curator and author Maria Kjær Themsen in the newspaper Information.

See also 
 Art Basel
 Frieze Art Fair
 The Armoury Show
 Art Cologne
 India Art Fair
 Art Fairs
 Contemporary art fairs

References 

Art fairs
Art exhibitions in Denmark